91st Street (Chesterfield) is an electrified commuter rail station along the Metra Electric Main Line in the Burnside neighborhood of Chicago, Illinois.

Like much of the main branch of the Metra Electric line, 91st Street-Chesterfield is built on elevated tracks near the embankment of a bridge over 91st Street. This bridge also carries the Amtrak line that runs parallel to it, carrying the City of New Orleans, Illini, and Saluki trains. A freight spur also exists north of the station.

East of this station there was another Metra Electric station along 91st Street known as 91st Street (South Chicago) along the South Chicago Branch. This was replaced by South Chicago-93rd Street Station in 2001. No bus connections are available. Street-side parking for 91st Street-Chesterfield station exists solely along both sides of 91st Street between the east side of the railroad bridge and the northwest and southwest corners of Drexel Avenue.

References

External links 

91st Street entrance from Google Maps Street View

Metra stations in Chicago
Former Illinois Central Railroad stations

 https://subwaynut.com/chicago/metra/metra_electric/91st_st_chesterfield/index.php